The 2015 Korea National League Championship, known as the Samsung Life 2015 National League Championship, was the twelfth competition of the Korea National League Championship.

Group stage

Group A

Group B

Knockout stage

Bracket

Semi-finals

Final

See also
2015 in South Korean football
2015 Korea National League

References

External links

Korea National League Championship seasons
K